Michael Francis Hickford was an Anglican priest in the late 20th and early 21st centuries.

He was born on 7 October 1953, educated at Gravesend Grammar School and ordained after a period of study at Edinburgh Theological College in 1986. He was  Chaplain of St John's Cathedral, Oban from 1986 to 1989 and then Rector, St Mungo, Alexandria, West Dunbartonshire until 1995. He was priest in charge of  St James the Great, Dingwall with St Anne, Strathpeffer; and from 1998 Dean of Moray, Ross and Caithness. From 2003 to 2004 he was Provost of St Andrew's Cathedral, Inverness and Hospital and Community Health Care Chaplain for NHS Highland since then.

Notes

1953 births
People educated at Gravesend Grammar School
Deans of Moray, Ross and Caithness
Provosts of Inverness Cathedral
Living people